Eyl Airport  is an airport serving Eyl (also spelled Eil), a town in the Nugal region in Puntland, Somalia.

Facilities

See also
List of airports in Somalia

References

External links
 Aeronautical chart at SkyVector
 

Airports in Somalia
Nugal, Somalia